Amara anthobia is a species of black coloured beetles from the genus Amara in the family Carabidae.

References

anthobia
Beetles described in 1833